Jevenstedt is a municipality in the district of Rendsburg-Eckernförde, in Schleswig-Holstein, Germany. It is situated approximately 8 km south of Rendsburg.

Jevenstedt is the seat of the Amt ("collective municipality") Jevenstedt.

References

Rendsburg-Eckernförde